Robert John Palmer (born January 18, 1849 – May 12, 1928) (there are multiple reported birth and death dates all within the same month) was a tailor and politician born into slavery in South Carolina. Palmer was a state representative from 1876 to 1878 and had a tailor shop opposite the post office on Main Street in Columbia, South Carolina.

He had a daughter, Rosina C. Palmer, with Julia Simons in Columbia in the 1870s.
He subsequently married Adelaide Perry and had eight children. After Adelaide died he married Leila P. Bruce January 12, 1913.

He is the great-great-grandfather of stand-up comedian Dave Chappelle.

He is buried in Randolph Cemetery along with eight other Reconstruction Era legislators.

See also
African-American officeholders during and following the Reconstruction era

References

External links 
 Findagrave entry

African-American politicians during the Reconstruction Era
African-American state legislators in South Carolina
1849 births
1928 deaths
20th-century African-American people